"Sose Me (Lights On)" (Greek: Σώσε Με; English: Save Me) is the second single by the Greek Cypriot singer Ivi Adamou from her first album Kalokairi Stin Kardia, written by Lene Dissing, Hanif Sabzevari, Dimitris Stassos, Marcus Winther-John and Giannis Doxas. It was released April 26, 2010. Japanese singer Ayumi Hamasaki has sampled the song for her 2012 song Tell me why.

Track listing
Digital download
"Sose Me (Lights On)" – 3:44
"Sose Me (Lights On)" (Karaoke version) – 3:44
"Sose Me (Lights On)" (Duomo Remix) – 3:38

Credits and personnel
 Lead vocals – Ivi Adamou
 Producers – Giorgos Sabanis
 Lyrics – Lene Dissing, Hanif Sabzevari, Dimitri Stassos, Marcus Winther-John, Doxas
 Label: Sony Music Greece/Day 1

Music video
The video music was published in Ivi's official channel in May 2010. The video was later blocked by SME and was published one year later, in May 2011 on Ivi's VEVO channel.

Release history

References

2010 singles
2010 songs
Ivi Adamou songs
Pop ballads
Songs written by Dimitri Stassos
Songs written by Giannis Doxas